The BossHoss is a German band from Berlin, founded in 2004. They originally started with country and western style cover versions of famous pop, rock and hip hop songs, for example "Hot in Herre" by Nelly, "Toxic" by Britney Spears and "Hey Ya!" by Outkast. They incorporate stereotypical American cowboy behavior into their act; they wear Stetson hats, tank tops and large sunglasses, and display whiskey bottles. The band refers to their music style as "Country Trash Punk Rock."

Band history 

The band was formed in 2004 in Berlin by Alec "Boss" Völkel, Sascha "Hoss" Vollmer and Michael Frick, and named after the song "The Real BossHoss" by The Sonics.
They were featured in the trendsetting music show Tracks (on French/German TV channel ARTE) and played live during the Kiel Week.
In late 2004, they signed a record deal with Universal Music Domestic Division.

In 2005, they released their debut album Internashville Urban Hymns and signed a promotional contract with ice cream producer Langnese, for which they covered "Like Ice in the Sunshine", the theme song from a Langnese's TV spot.
The band played about 180 concerts that year. In 2005, they adapted "Ca plane pour moi" from Belgian artist Plastic Bertrand.

In 2006, BossHoss provided the soundtrack for the football film . Release of the first single "I Say a Little Prayer" on April 28 and the second album "Rodeo Radio" on May 19. Half of that second album were their own songs, the other half cover versions. After they had released the second album, their first album rose into the charts again, sold 100,000 copies by the end of May 2006, and became a gold record in Germany.

Band members 

 Boss Burns (Alec Völkel)  - vocals, washboard 
 Hoss Power (Sascha Vollmer) - acoustic and electric guitars, vocals
 Sir Frank Doe (Ansgar Freyberg) - drums
 Hank Williamson (Malcolm Arison) - mandoline, washboard, stylophone, harp
 Guss Brooks (André Neumann) - acoustic and electric basses
 Russ T. Rocket (Stefan Buehler) - electric guitar
 Ernesto Escobar de Tijuana (Tobias Fischer) - percussion, keytar melodica

Past members 
 Michael Frick - double bass
 Russ (Boris Kontorkowski) - electric guitar
 Russ T. Nail (Dean Micetech) - electric guitar
 Hank Doodle (Mathias Fauvet) - mandolin, washboard, harp

Discography

Studio albums 

Others
Stallion Battalion live from Cologne (Released March 7, 2008) (Double-CD plus DVD)

 Singles 

Notes
"Hey Ya!" is a cover of OutKast
"Hot in Herre / Like Ice in the Sunshine" is a double A side single with covers of Nelly and the Langnese theme
"Heroes/helden" is a remake of David Bowie's "Heroes"Christmas-CD contains a cover of "Last Christmas" by Wham! and "Riding Home for Christmas"
"I Say a Little Prayer" is a Bacharach-David composition; side B is "You'll Never Walk Alone", a Rodgers-Hammerstein composition
"Ring, Ring, Ring" is a cover of De La Soul

 DVDs Internashville Urban Hymns, die DVDs'' (2005; available only in Germany)

References

External links 

Biography at Motor Music
Boss Hoss at Gracenote

German parodists
Musical groups established in 2004
German country rock groups
Musical groups from Berlin
Parody musicians